Wesley Crusher is a fictional character in the Star Trek franchise. He appears regularly in the first four seasons of the television series Star Trek: The Next Generation (TNG), and sporadically in its next three seasons. He also appeared in the feature film Star Trek: Nemesis (2002) and in Star Trek: Picard (2022). He is the son of Beverly Crusher and Jack Crusher and is portrayed by actor Wil Wheaton.

Overview

Television series and films
In the television series Star Trek: The Next Generation, Wesley Crusher first arrives on the Enterprise-D with his mother, soon after Captain Jean-Luc Picard assumes command. Crusher's father was killed while under Picard's command, with Picard delivering the message to Wesley and to his mother, Beverly. Picard initially found Wesley irritating, as he is often uncomfortable around children, a fact he discloses to his first officer, Commander William Riker, in the pilot episode "Encounter at Farpoint". 

In early episodes of the series, Picard does not allow Wesley on the ship's bridge. However, during the first season, Picard comes to realize that Wesley understands many things beyond his age, having inherited his mother's intelligence, and grants him more opportunities onboard. An alien known as the Traveler tells Captain Picard that Wesley possesses a unique intelligence and great potential when provided encouragement and opportunity, comparing him to a child prodigy like Mozart. Picard soon appoints Crusher as acting ensign.

In the episode "Coming of Age", Crusher takes the Starfleet Academy entrance exam, but fails to pass it. In the episode "Ménage à Troi", he misses his second chance to take the exam; but when he helps the Enterprise-D crew rescue Riker, Deanna Troi and Lwaxana Troi from hostile Ferengi, Picard grants him a field promotion to full ensign.

In the third-season episode "The Bonding", Crusher reveals that following his father's death, he felt animosity towards Picard, because Picard was in command of the Stargazer during the mission in which Wesley's father was killed. By the end of the episode, he no longer harbors these feelings.

The following year, Crusher is invited to re-take the Academy exam. He is accepted, and joins an elite group of cadets known as Nova Squadron. In the fifth-season episode "The First Duty", a squadron-mate is killed attempting a dangerous and prohibited flight maneuver and, under pressure from the team's leader, Nick Locarno, Crusher abets the squadron's efforts to cover up the truth. Although the Enterprise crew's intervention and Crusher's own testimony saves him from expulsion, Crusher's academic credits for the year are revoked; he is required to repeat the year and graduate after most of the rest of his class. He remains in the Academy until the Traveler recontacts him in a later season 7 episode, "Journey's End", where he resigns his commission and goes with the Traveler to explore other planes of reality.

Crusher is next seen sitting next to his mother in the background of the wedding scenes in the feature film Star Trek: Nemesis. In a scene deleted from the film, Captain Picard asks Crusher if he is excited to serve on board the USS Titan (Captain Riker's ship). Crusher tells him that he will be running the night shift in Engineering, which would have indicated that Wesley returned to Starfleet prior to the events of the film and held the rank of Lieutenant.

Crusher returns in the Star Trek: Picard season 2 episode Farewell. In the years since Star Trek: Nemesis, he has rejoined the Travelers, traveling across space and time. In the year 2024, he approaches Kore Soong and reveals that he and his fellow Travelers were responsible for creating the Supervisors and the Watchers to help ensure the universe's survival. He offers Kore a position with the Travelers, although he can't guarantee her safety, and she accepts.

Reception
The Wesley Crusher character was unpopular among some Star Trek fans. Many considered the character a Mary Sue, and a stand-in for Gene Roddenberry (whose middle name was Wesley). The character's role in the show was greatly downplayed after the first season when Roddenberry's involvement in the show's production became more peripheral.

Some fans disliked the idea of a boy who seemed to regularly save the whole ship as a deus ex machina plot device. Commentators have observed at least seven times in which Crusher, "who has trouble getting into the Starfleet Academy" and is on a ship "filled with Starfleet's best and brightest crew members", has come up with "the needed solution". Fans' dislike for Crusher has become something of a pop-culture meme, reflected in other TV shows such as The Big Bang Theory, the English dub of Steins;Gate, and in a 2009 Family Guy episode, "Not All Dogs Go to Heaven", which included the main The Next Generation cast and featured Wil Wheaton in character as Crusher being bullied by Patrick Stewart.

Wheaton wrote: "When I was younger, people gave me such a hard time about Wesley Crusher, there was a time in my late teens and early twenties when I resented Star Trek. It felt so unfair that people who had never met me were so cruel and hateful toward me as a person because they didn’t like a character I played on a TV show, I wanted to put Star Trek behind me and forget that it was ever part of my life."

In a 2016 issue of Wired magazine, Wesley Crusher was ranked 31st of the 100 most important Starfleet characters in the Star Trek science fiction universe.

References

External links

 Wesley Crusher biography at StarTrek.com

Star Trek: The Next Generation characters
Star Trek (film franchise) characters
Starfleet ensigns
Starfleet officers
Fictional space pilots
Fictional people from the 24th-century
Television characters introduced in 1987
Child characters in television